Yonlada Ronghanam, nicknamed Nong (born January 7, 1970, in Bangkok, Thailand) is Miss Thailand 1989. She competed in the Miss Universe 1989 pageant held in Mexico.

References 

1970 births
Living people
Yonlada Ronghanam
Miss Universe 1989 contestants
Yonlada Ronghanam